Trinitee Stokes (born April 12, 2006) is an American child actress, singer and fashion designer. She is known for her role as Judy Cooper in the Disney Channel television series K.C. Undercover.

Early life and education 
Stokes was born in Jackson, Mississippi, the daughter of Taronta and Kia Stokes. She currently attends Emerson College in Boston.

Career

Acting 
Stokes began her acting career in local theaters at the age of three. She has since appeared in numerous commercials for top national brands, including Kellogg's, Carrier and McDonald's. Her first major acting role was in the 2014 feature film Tempting Fate. In 2015, she was cast in the Disney Channel sitcom K.C. Undercover as Judy Cooper. K.C. Undercover premiered on Disney Channel on January 18, 2015, and was renewed for a third season in November 2016. Stokes also guest starred on an episode of Disney Channel sitcom Austin & Ally. In 2017, she made a guest appearance as Laura on the TV Land sitcom Teachers.

Author

Stokes landed a book deal with Zondervan Publishing at age 11. Trinitee’s award-winning book, Bold & Blessed: How to Stay True to Yourself and Stand Out from the Crowd was released in 2018.

Voice roles 
Stokes lent her voice for the  Princess Tiana doll from the Disney movie The Princess and the Frog. She was also a guest star on Disney Junior's Doc McStuffins.

Music 
In 2013, Stokes released Win Now, an independent gospel single. In 2017, she released the independent pop single Miss Me. The song was written by Jake&Papa and produced by Jovan Dawkins.

Fashion 
In 2013, she hosted an episode of the TV documentary, The Designer Kids Project and unveiled Designs by Trinitee. The collection features clothing aimed at tween girls. She is often seen sporting her designs at red carpet appearances. In 2016, she unveiled her most recent collection at Fashion Fest Live in Los Angeles, CA.

Filmography

Film

Television

See also 
 List of African-American actors
 List of people born in Mississippi

References

External links 
Interview with Stokes (2015)

External links 
 
 

2006 births
Actresses from Mississippi
African-American actresses
American child actresses
American voice actresses
Living people
People from Jackson, Mississippi
American television actresses
21st-century American actresses
21st-century African-American women
21st-century African-American people